Kim Strömberg (born December 8, 1987) is a Finnish professional ice hockey Winger who currently plays for HC Kometa Brno of the Czech Extraliga (ELH).

Playing career
Strömberg started his professional career in his native Finland for Jokerit of the then SM-liiga, before moving to league rivals Tappara. In the 2013–14 season, Strömberg helped HC Bolzano in their inaugural season in the EBEL, to become the first non Austrian league champions by scoring 13 points in as many post season games.

On April 17, 2014,  Strömberg opted to leave Bolzano and join his third EBEL club, EC KAC on an optional two-year contract. At the conclusion of the 2014–15 season with Klagenfurt,  Strömberg opted not to fulfil his second contracted year in Austria and returned to Finland, signing with SaiPa of the Liiga on June 22, 2015.

References

External links

1987 births
Living people
Bolzano HC players
Herning Blue Fox players
Jokerit players
EC KAC players
HC Kometa Brno players
KooKoo players
Orli Znojmo players
IK Oskarshamn players
HK Poprad players
SaiPa players
Tappara players
Finnish ice hockey forwards
Ice hockey people from Helsinki
Finnish expatriate ice hockey players in Slovakia
Finnish expatriate ice hockey players in the Czech Republic
Finnish expatriate ice hockey players in Italy
Finnish expatriate ice hockey players in Austria
Finnish expatriate ice hockey players in Denmark
Finnish expatriate ice hockey players in Sweden
Roller hockey players